Thandi may refer to:

People

Given name
Thandi Brewer, South African television actress
Thandi Klaasen (1931–2017), South African jazz singer
Thandi Modise (born 1959), South African politician
Thandi Ndlovu (c. 1954–2019), South African medical doctor and businesswoman
Thandi Gloria Mpambo-Sibhukwana (died 2020), South African educator and legislator
Thandie Newton (known as Thandi; born 1972), English actress
Thandi Orleyn (born 1956), South African lawyer
Thandi Phoenix (born 1993), Australian singer-songwriter
Thandi Sibisi (born 1986), South African art gallery owner and former model
Thandi Tshabalala (born 1984), South African cricketer

Surname
Karman Thandi (born 1998), Indian tennis player

Other uses
Thandi River, is a river of Burma